Double Up is a public art work by Australian-American artist Clement Meadmore located at the Lynden Sculpture Garden near Milwaukee, Wisconsin. The sculpture is an abstract, twisting form made of weathering steel; it is installed on the lawn.

References

1970 sculptures
Outdoor sculptures in Milwaukee
Sculptures by Clement Meadmore
Steel sculptures in Wisconsin
1970 establishments in Wisconsin